Harrison George Hopper (born 24 December 2000) is an English professional footballer who plays as a midfielder for Bradford (Park Avenue).

Career
On 7 November 2018, after graduating from Rochdale's academy, Hopper made his debut for the club in a 2–2 EFL Trophy draw against Leicester City U21. On 23 November 2019, Hopper made his league debut for the club in a 3–0 defeat against Portsmouth.

In February 2020 he joined Colne on loan.

Following his release from Rochdale, he signed for National League North side York City, the city he was raised in, following a successful trial period.

On 22 January 2022, Hopper signed an 18-month contract with National League North side Bradford (Park Avenue).

References

2000 births
Living people
English footballers
Footballers from the London Borough of Camden
Association football midfielders
Rochdale A.F.C. players
Colne F.C. players
York City F.C. players
Bradford (Park Avenue) A.F.C. players
English Football League players
National League (English football) players